Idiomarina aquatica is a Gram-negative, moderately halophilic and aerobic bacterium from the genus of Idiomarina which has been isolated from a saltern from Huelva in Spain.

References

Bacteria described in 2015
Alteromonadales